A project is an undertaking planned and carried out to achieve a particular aim.

(The) Project may also refer to:

Arts, entertainment, and media

Music
 Project (album), a 1997 music album by Greg Howe and Richie Kotzen
 DJ Project, a Romanian dance music group
 The Project (Lindsay Ell album), a 2017 music album by Lindsay Ell
 The Project (Rishi Rich album), a 2006 music album by British producer Rishi Rich

Television
 The Project (Australian TV program), an Australian talk show
 The Project (New Zealand TV programme), a New Zealand talk show
 The Mindy Project, an American television series

Other uses in arts, entertainment, and media
 The Project (film), a British drama
 Proekt, a Russian media outlet

Brands and enterprises
 Microsoft Project, project management software 
 Rubicon Project, an American online advertising technology firm
 Pro-Ject, an Austrian audio equipment manufacturer

See also
 
 
 Projection (disambiguation)
 Projector (disambiguation)
 Protect (disambiguation)
 The PJs